Shuysky District is an administrative and municipal district (raion), one of the twenty-one in Ivanovo Oblast, Russia. It is located in the center of the oblast. Its administrative center is the town of Shuya (which is not administratively a part of the district). Population:   23,660 (2002 Census);

Administrative and municipal status
Within the framework of administrative divisions, Shuysky District is one of the twenty-one in the oblast. The town of Shuya serves as its administrative center, despite being incorporated separately as an administrative unit with the status equal to that of the districts.

As a municipal division, the district is incorporated as Shuysky Municipal District. The Town of Shuya is incorporated separately from the district as Shuya Urban Okrug.

References

Notes

Sources

Districts of Ivanovo Oblast
